Kohn is both a first name and a surname. Kohn means cook in Yiddish. It may also be related to Cohen. Notable people with the surname include:

 Angela Kohn (Jacki-O), rapper
 Arnold Kohn, Croatian Zionist and longtime president of the Jewish community Osijek
 Alfie Kohn, American lecturer and author
 Bernard Kohn, architect
 Dan Kohn-Sherbock, Jewish theologian
 David Kohn, Russian archaeologist
 Donald Kohn, American economist, former Federal Reserve Vice Chair
 Eugene Kohn, rabbi 
 Fritz Kortner (born as Fritz Nathan Kohn), Austrian-born stage and film actor
 Joseph J. Kohn, mathematician
 Hans Kohn, philosopher and historian
 Ladislav Kohn, Czech hockey player
 Matt Kohn, American football player
 Michael Kohn, American major league baseball pitcher
 Mike Kohn, American bobsledder
 Milton Kohn, American architect and holocaust collector
 Ralph Kohn (1927–2016), British medical scientist and benefactor of music
 Robert D. Kohn, architect
 Sigurd Kohn, Norwegian jazz saxophonist and composer
 Sonja Kohn, Austrian banker
 Walter Kohn, theoretical physicist and Nobel laureate

See also 
 KOHN, FM radio station operated by the Tohono O'odham Nation, Arizona, USA
 Cahn
 Coen (disambiguation)
 Cohan
 Cohn
 Cohen
 Coyne
 Kahn
 Kohan
 Kohen
 Kuhn

Kohenitic_surnames